Nikita Chepchumba Kering', popularly known as Nikita Kering', is a Kenyan musician, actress and media personality.

Early life and education 
She was born on February 26, 2002, in Nairobi, Kenya. She attended Riara Springs Academy, Kilimani Junior Academy and Brookhouse International School where she completed her A-level studies from a partial scholarship, given to support her musical career.

Career 
She started her career at an early age. In 2012, during an album launch by Emmy Kosgey, she sang to a huge audience, and was critically acclaimed for her performance. Afterwards, she signed a record deal with EmPawa Africa and was selected to undergo an international training and mentoring program. Nikita became a finalist during the contest, but was deemed too young to compete at the highest stage; nonetheless it brought her to the limelight.

Awards 
 2018 Pulse Music Video Awards (PMVA) for Best New Artiste
 2019 All Africa Music Awards for Best Female Artiste in Eastern Africa
 2019 All Africa Music Awards for Revelation of the African Continent
 2021 All Africa Music Awards for Best RnB and Soul Artist
 2021 All Africa Music Awards for Best Female Artiste East Africa

References 

Kenyan musicians
21st-century Kenyan actresses

2002 births
Living people
Kenyan women musicians